The 2023 EASL Champions Week was the pre-season tournament of the 2023 East Asia Super League, an international basketball club competition involving teams from domestic leagues in Japan, South Korea, Philippines and Taiwan, as well as a franchise team representing Greater China. The Champions Week is being held from 1 to 5 March 2023.

The Champions Week was conceptualized after the regular season was postponed.  The regular season was originally scheduled to be held from 12 October 2022 to February 2023, under a home and away format and a Final Four knockout stage.

The winners received USD 250,000, while the runners-up and third-place teams received USD 100,000 and USD 50,000, respectively.

Team allocation
The eight teams which qualified for the then-2022–23 EASL season qualified for the Champions Week. Four leagues are represented for the 2023 EASL. The champions and runners-up of the Japan B.League and the Korean Basketball League as well as the champions of Taiwan's P. League+ Hong Kong based Bay Area Chun Yu Phoenixes, a franchise team not part of any domestic league also participated. The league considers the P. League+ champions and the Phoenixes as representatives of "Greater China". For the Philippines, the top two finishing teams of the 2022 PBA Philippine Cup qualified.

Qualified teams

Imports
Each team can register two foreign players, plus an Asian heritage or naturalized player as imports.

Venues
Games were held in Japan, on the home venues of the two qualified Japanese teams – Utsunomiya Brex and the Ryukyu Golden Kings. There were ten games in total. Utsunomiya hosted six of the eight group stage games, while Ryukyu hosted the remaining two games, as well as the third place game and final.

Draw
The official draw for the 2022–23 EASL season was held on 28 June 2022 at the Shangri-La at the Fort, Manila in Taguig. For the Champions Week the groupings were retained.

The teams were drawn in two groups. A coin flipping mechanic was used; each champion in each domestic league was to choose a coin side. The winner of the coin flip was placed on Group A while the other placed in Group B. The identity of the Philippine representatives were yet to be determined at the time of the draw.

Another draw was held to determine the schedule of the games.

Group stage
On 10 January 2023, EASL released the full schedule for the tournament. Each team in each of the two groups would face only two of three of the other teams in their group unlike in a traditional round robin format.

Group A

Group B

Final round

Third place game

Final

Final standing

References

2022–23 in Asian basketball leagues
March 2023 sports events in Japan